Rhamphomyia albidiventris is a species of dance flies, in the fly family Empididae. It is included in the subgenus Pararhamphomyia. It has a limited distribution. It has been recorded from Great Britain, Germany, Austria, Slovakia, Bosnia, Finland and central Russia.

References

External links
Fauna Europaea

Rhamphomyia
Asilomorph flies of Europe
Insects described in 1898
Taxa named by Gabriel Strobl